Calvin Christian School is a private Christian school in Escondido, California. It consists of a preschool, elementary school, junior high, and high school.

External links
 

Christian schools in California
High schools in San Diego County, California
Private high schools in California
Private middle schools in California
Private elementary schools in California
Education in Escondido, California